John, Johnny, or Johnnie Dixon may refer to:

Arts and entertainment
John Dixon (engraver) (1740?–1811), Irish mezzotint engraver
John Dixon (filmmaker) (died 1999), Australian screenwriter and director
John Dixon (cartoonist) (1929–2015), Australian comic book artist
John Dixon (As the World Turns), fictional American TV soap opera character
Johnny Dixon (series), titular character of series of children's novels

Politics and law
John Dixon (1785–1857), Member of Parliament for Carlisle, England, 1847–1848
John Dixon (trade unionist) (1828–1876), British trade unionist
John Dixon (Wisconsin politician) (1853–1938), American businessman and politician
John Allen Dixon Jr. (1920–2003), Associate Justice of the Louisiana Supreme Court
John Dixon (Welsh politician) (born 1951), Welsh politician and member of Plaid Cymru
John Dixon (judge), Australian judge

Sports
John Dixon (English sportsman) (1861–1931), Nottinghamshire cricketer and international footballer
John Dixon (Australian rules footballer) (1887–1947), Australian rules footballer 
Johnnie Bob Dixon (1899–1985), American baseball player
Johnny Dixon (1923–2009), English footballer
John Dixon (rugby league), Australian rugby league footballer and coach
John Henry Dixon (born 1954), English cricketer, publisher and author

Others
John Dixon (engineer) (c. 1795–1865), English railway civil engineer
John Dixon (bishop) (1888–1972), Canadian cleric, Anglican Bishop of Montreal

See also
Jack Dixon (born 1994), Welsh rugby player
Jonathan Dixon (disambiguation)
John Dickson (disambiguation)